Phidippus regius, known commonly as the regal jumper, is a species of jumping spider in eastern North America.

Description 

Males and females are not easily differentiated when juvenile as females can portray the common colourations of the male, especially if they are dark or black phased. The males are always black with a pattern of white spots and stripes. Females often bear similar patterns to the males, but range in color from shades of white to a vivid orange. The three spots on the back of the spider's abdomen often resemble a smiling face but on closer inspection the dots themselves are often uniquely shaped from spider to spider. These spots are normally white in males but can be orange, cream or white in females. 

The regal jumping spider belongs to the genus Phidippus, a group of jumping spiders easily identified both by their relatively large size and their iridescent chelicerae. The Phidippus Regius can have chelicerae that are blue, teal, green, gold, purple, pink, red and orange. Although females can have green and blue which are commonly seen in males, males are not noted to have the pinks and reds.

Phidippus regius is not a medically significant spider and is generally considered hesitant to bite. While bites rarely occur, symptoms are mostly limited to some localised swelling and pain unless the victim is allergic.

Habitat
P. regius is most commonly found in relatively open areas, such as fields and light woodland, with adults usually preferring trees or the walls of buildings as hunting grounds. They build silken nests at night in which to sleep, often in palm fronds or similar areas. Females of the species lay their eggs under the bark of trees, or in secluded spots in wooden structures such as barns.

Distribution
P. regius occurs in the southeastern United States and the West Indies, and has been introduced to Easter Island. In the United States, it occurs throughout the Southeast from South Mississippi through North Carolina and South Carolina. It is most common on the Florida peninsula.

References

External links

Regal jumping spider on the UF / IFAS Featured Creatures Web site

Salticidae
Spiders of North America
Spiders described in 1846